Gijsbrecht van Brederode (1416 – Breda, 15 August 1475) was bishop-elect of Utrecht from 1455 to 1456.

Gijsbrecht van Brederode was a son of Walraven I van Brederode and the brother of Reinoud II van Brederode. He was provost in Utrecht and as leader of the Hook faction, led the resistance against Rudolf van Diepholt. On 7 April 1455 he was elected bishop by the chapters, but Philip the Good put pressure on pope Calixtus III to appoint Philip's bastard son; David of Burgundy. Philip violently quelled the resistance against this appointment and besieged Deventer. In 1456 Gijsbrecht agreed to retract his claim to the bishopric in return for a large financial compensation. He remained, however, a thorn in the side of David, who imprisoned him together with his brother Reinoud in 1470.

1415 births
1475 deaths
Gijsbrecht van Brederode
15th-century Roman Catholic bishops in the Holy Roman Empire
Gijsbrecht
People from Velsen